Tirupullamangai or Thirupullamangai is a Hindu temple dedicated to Lord Siva located in Pasupathikoil, Papanasam taluk of Thanjavur district, Tamil Nadu, India. It is one of the shrines of the 275 Paadal Petra Sthalams - Shiva Sthalams glorified in the early medieval Tevaram poems by Tamil Saivite Nayanar Tirugnanasambandar.

Architecture 

The lord of this temple Shiva as Brahamapurisvarar is also known as Alandurai Mahadevar. The temple has been revered by the verses of sambandar, one of the Nayanmars.

The shrine of Lord Siva faces east; the temple is entered through a small gopuram(entrance tower) on the eastern side of the enclosing wall.  Both of these, along with the hall, directly in front of the entrance, are of recent date, as are various subsidiary buildings on either sides of the gopuram and the goddess shrine in the north of the hall.  The original parivara (attendant deities) have disappeared. The temple is counted as one of the temples built on the banks of River Kaveri. It is located on the banks of Kudamurutti River, a tributary of river Kaveri.

Saptamangai sthalam
This temple is one of the seven shrines associated with Saptamartrikas (seven female deities in Siva temple). Matrikas are the different forms Adi Parashakti.  Matrikas are the personified powers of different Devas. Brahmani emerged from Brahma, Vaishnavi from Vishnu, Maheshvari from Shiva, Indrani from Indra, Kaumari from Skanda, Varahi from Varaha and Chamunda from Devi, and additionals are Narasimhi, Vinayaki. This is one of the Saptamangai sthalams, seven sacred places devoted to Devi. They are also called as Saptastanam of Chakkarappalli. They are:
 Chakkarappalli 
 Ariyamangai  
 Sulamangalam 
 Nallichery
 Pasupathikovil 
 Thazhamangai 
 Pullamangai

History
The temple should have existed as a brick structure from 7th Century. The stone temple should have been built during the reign of Parantaka Chola I, which is evident from the inscriptions found in the temple. There are also inscriptions from the period of Sundara Chola,  Adiya Karikalan and Raja Raja Chola I.

According to historian Harle, the temple is counted among the four early extant temples of the Chola Empire, with the other three being Koranganatha Temple in Tiruchirappalli district, Moovar Koil in Pudukottai district and Nageswaran temple at Kumbakonam These temples follow the Pallava architecture which are relatively small in size. They all have a fair-sized porch, locally called ardhamandapa attached to the sanctum, both of which are slightly below the ground level in a pit kind of structure. The structures are also predominantly built of stone.

The garbhagriha(sanctum) and the arthamandapa(secluded hall) of the temple belong to the earlier structure, while there have been newer structures added to it lately. All the parivara(consort) shrines of the earlier period have not survived and few newer shrines have come up. 
The sculptures of this temple is highly acclaimed for its beauty. Apart from the lovely devakoshta(divine) images of Dakshinamurthy, Lingodhbhavar, Brahma and Durga,  the vimana(shrine) too houses exquisite images of Vishnu, Narashima, Tripurantaka. The temple has series of miniature panels depicting scenes from Ramayana. The sculpting in this temple is of high class and speaks volume of Chola artistry.

Notes

References

Miniature sculptures in the temple

Padal Petra Stalam
Shiva temples in Thanjavur district